The Falange Española Tradicionalista y de las Juntas de Ofensiva Nacional Sindicalista (FET y de las JONS), frequently shortened to just "FET", was the sole legal party of the Francoist regime in Spain. It was created by General Francisco Franco in 1937 as a merger of the fascist Falange Española de las JONS (FE de las JONS) with the monarchist neoabsolutist and ultracatholic Traditionalist Communion belonging to the Carlist movement. In addition to the resemblance of names, the party formally retained most of the platform of FE de las JONS (26 out of 27 points) and a similar inner structure. In force until April 1977, it was rebranded as Movimiento Nacional in 1958.

History

Early history

The FET y de las JONS began as the Spanish Falange, a Falangist party, The Council of National Syndicalist Offensives, a national syndicalist party and  Traditionalist Communion, a Catholic monarchist party, three parties that were becoming relevant in Spanish right wing politics before the civil war.  The Spanish Falange and the Council of National Syndicalist Offensives were relatively small, and merged into the Spanish Falange de la JONS leading up to the 1936 election.  As civil war broke out, the Falange grew rapidly in membership, and the Traditionalist Communion, already a prominent force, mobilized its forces to fight the leftist government.

Spanish Civil War
With the eruption of the Civil War in July 1936, the Falange fought on the side of the Nationalist faction against the Second Spanish Republic. Expanding rapidly from several thousand to several hundred thousand, the Falange's male membership was accompanied by a female auxiliary, the Sección Femenina. Led by José Antonio's sister Pilar, this latter subsidiary organization claimed more than a half million members by the end of the war and provided nursing and support services for the Nationalist forces.

The command of the party rested upon Manuel Hedilla as many of the first generation leaders were dead or incarcerated by the Republicans. Among them was Primo de Rivera, who was a government prisoner. As a result, he was referred to among the leadership as el Ausente, ("the Absent One"). After being sentenced to death on 18 November 1936, José Antonio Primo de Rivera was executed on 20 November 1936 (a date since known as 20-N in Spain) in a Republican prison, giving him martyr status among the Falangists. This conviction and sentence was possible because he had lost his parliamentary immunity after his party did not have enough votes during the last elections.

On April 19, 1937 Francisco Franco issued a Unification Decree, which forcibly merged the Falange with the Carlist Comunión Tradicionalista to form the Falange Española Tradicionalista y de las JONS (FET y de las JONS). Franco assumed the role of jefe nacional ("National Chief"), following the model of a fascist party. All other parties supporting the rebel faction were disbanded, but former members of those parties were free to join the FET as individual members. The new party's official ideology was the Falangists' 27 puntos—reduced after the unification to 26, the article barring mergers being dropped. The merged party incorporated many Falangist symbols–the blue shirt, the yoked arrows, the red and black flag, and the anthem Cara al Sol among others. Despite this, the party was in fact a wide-ranging nationalist coalition, closely controlled by Franco. Parts of the original Falange (including Hedilla) and many Carlists did not join the unified party. Franco had sought to control the Falange after a clash between Hedilla and his main critics within the group, the legitimistas of Agustín Aznar and Sancho Dávila y Fernández de Celis, that threatened to derail the Nationalist war effort. Franco became jefe nacional and "Supreme Caudillo" of the FET. He was vested with "the most absolute authority," including the power to name his successor, and was only responsible to "God and history."

None of the vanquished parties in the war suffered such a toll of deaths among their leaders as did the Falange. 60% of the pre-war Falange membership lost their lives in the war.

However, most of the property of all other parties and trade unions were assigned to the party. In 1938, all trade unions were unified under Falangist command.

Francoist Spain

After the war, the party was charged with developing an ideology for Franco's regime. This job became a cursus honorum for ambitious politicians—new converts, who were called camisas nuevas ("new shirts") in opposition to the more overtly populist and ideological "old shirts" from before the war.

Membership in the Falange/FET reached a peak of 932,000 in 1942. Despite the official unification of the various Nationalist factions within the party in 1937, tensions continued between dedicated Falangists and other groups, particularly Carlists. Such tensions erupted in violence with the Begoña Incident of August 1942, when hardline Falangist activists attacked a Carlist religious gathering in Bilbao with grenades. The attack and the response of government ministers with Carlist leanings (most notably Varela and Galarza) led to a government crisis and caused Franco to dismiss several ministers. Ultimately, six Falangists were convicted of the attack and one, Juan Domínguez, was executed.

By the middle of the Second World War, Franco and leading Falangists, while distancing themselves from the faltering European fascists, stressed the unique "Spanish Catholic authoritarianism" of the regime and the Falange. Instructions were issued in September 1943 that henceforth the Falange/FET would be referred to exclusively as a "movement" and not a "party".

The Falange also developed youth organizations, with members known as Flechas and Pelayos, under the umbrella of the Spanish Youths Organization. Most of these young members wore red berets.

With improving relations with the United States, economic development and the rise of a group of relatively young technocrats within the government, the Falange continued to decline. In 1965, the SEU, the movement's student organization, was officially disbanded. At the same time, the membership of the Falange as a whole was both shrinking and aging. In 1974, the average age of Falangists in Madrid was at least 55 years. The organization's relatively few new members came mostly from the conservative and devoutly Catholic areas of northern Spain.

References
Informational notes

Citations

Bibliography
 
 
 
 
 
 
 

 
Political parties established in 1937
Political parties disestablished in 1977
Defunct political parties in Spain
Parties of one-party systems
Falangist parties
Fascist parties in Spain
Catholic political parties
Francoist Spain
20th century in Spain
Political history of Spain
Spanish nationalism
National syndicalism
Far-right political parties in Spain